Guns for Hire is a 1932 American Western film directed by Lewis D. Collins and starring Lane Chandler, Sally Darling and Neal Hart.

Cast
Lane Chandler as Flip LaRue - aka Ken Wayne 
Sally Darling as Sue Thornton 
Neal Hart as Whispering Carlyle
Yakima Canutt as Sheriff Pete Peterson 
John Ince as Matt Thornton 
Slim Whitaker as Hank Moran 
Jack Rockwell as Monk Weaver 
Ben Corbett as Fatso Gans 
Steve Clemente as Flash Gomez - aka Gunnison 
Bill Patton as Joe Patron 
Hank Bell as Duke Monahan 
John McGuire as Jim Thornton 
Frances Morris as Polly Clark 
Nelson McDowell as inquest official 
John Bacon as Frank Lloyd 
Ed Porter as Dr. Peter Bartlett

Plot
Gunfighter Wayne helps Thornton, who has been erroneously accused of killing a card shark. While doing so, Wayne encounters a gang led by his foster father (Carlyle), who is working with a cattle rancher and the sheriff to take control of the sheep ranch owned by Thornton and his father.

Production notes 
Interior scenes were filmed at Talisman Studio in Hollywood, with location shooting at Lone Pine, California.

References

External links

1932 Western (genre) films
American Western (genre) films
Films directed by Lewis D. Collins
1930s American films
1930s English-language films